The Kris Aquino Show is a 1996 Philippine television talk show broadcast by GMA Network. Hosted by Kris Aquino, it premiered on PTV on April 15, 1996. The show moved to GMA Network on August 12, 1996. The show concluded on October 25, 1996.

External links
 

1996 Philippine television series debuts
1996 Philippine television series endings
Filipino-language television shows
People's Television Network original programming
Philippine television talk shows
GMA Network original programming
Television series by Viva Television